The Great Britain Women's Rugby League tour of New Zealand in 1998 was the first such visit by a female British or English Rugby League team, and their second tour after a 1996 visit to Australia. Six matches were played during the three-week tour, including three Test Matches. 
For the host nation, New Zealand, this tour followed on from a visit by the Australian women's rugby league team during the previous year, 1997.

Great Britain won the three tour matches but lost each of the three Test Matches by large margins, registering a single try and two goals in the series.

Team Leadership 
The team was coached by Jackie Sheldon. Roland Davis was tour manager and Lisa McCandless was team manager. The team was captained by Lisa McIntosh with vice-captain Liz Kitchen. Paula Clark served as the team's physiotherapist.

Squad 
A photo of the 1998 touring team is included with the Gilmour interview on the Women in Rugby League website. 
Point scorers are known for five of the six matches, excluding the first tour match against New Zealand Māori. Joanne Hewson scored a try against Auckland, and another try in the 1st Test. Joanna Will scored two tries in the match against Canterbury. 
The Jumper Number column shows the order players were listed in the team named for the 2nd Test, which appeared in a preview article in the Christchurch newspaper, The Press.

Results 

A 'spectacular' try to Brenda Dobek in the closing minutes won the match for Great Britain, against an Auckland side that were missing their national team representatives.

1st Test 

Playing a more physical game, to dominate possession and territory, New Zealand scored three converted tries in the first 30 minutes. A slick switch pass by Debbie Chase sent Trish Hina in for the opener. Leah Witehira found a gap for the second and Germaine Wiki broke through tackles for the third try.

Both teams displayed improved defence in the second half, with Great Britain 'tackling ferociously' on their own line. Capitalising on sustain pressure, Trish Hina scored her second try after 15 minutes. In an 80-metre run, winger Sara White fended off two defenders and outsprinted others for an 80th minute try. 

The Canterbury team included a mother & daughter pairing, second rower Mary Brennan, aged 41, and centre Mereana Brennan, aged 17. Other players to feature for Canterbury included loose forward Vicki Blair, Kylie O'Loughlin, Melany Taniora-Green and Vicki Logopati. They were coached Jack Tauwhare.

2nd Test 

Leah Witehira collected her own grubber kick to score the second try, then gave the last pass to Trish Hina for the third and final first half try. 
The Kiwi Ferns added five tries in the second half.

3rd Test 

New Zealand dominated the first half, obtaining a 30 to nil lead at the break.

New Zealand Team 
The New Zealand Rugby League Annual '98 included a three-page report, including four photos. The report lists 17 players in the New Zealand team. It is not clear whether each of the 17 played in all three Test Matches. The 17 listed do match the teams named in preview articles for the series and 2nd Test.

Sources 
A physical copy of the New Zealand Rugby League Annual '98 is available at the National Library of New Zealand. 
British and New Zealand Newspapers available via eResources such as ProQuest and Newsbank.

See also 
 Women's rugby league
 Australia women's national rugby league team
 Great Britain women's national rugby league team
 England women's national rugby league team

References

External links 
 Women in Rugby League

1998 in English rugby league
1998 in English women's sport
1998 in women's rugby league
Women's rugby league
Rugby league tours of New Zealand
New Zealand women's national rugby league team